The men's kata competition in karate at the 2022 World Games took place on 8 July 2022 at the Bill Battle Coliseum in Birmingham, United States.

Results

Elimination round

Pool A

Pool B

Finals

References

Karate at the 2022 World Games